In mathematics, injections, surjections, and bijections are classes of functions distinguished by the manner in which arguments (input expressions from the domain) and images (output expressions from the codomain) are related or mapped to each other.

A function maps elements from its domain to elements in its codomain. Given a function :

The function is injective, or one-to-one, if each element of the codomain is mapped to by at most one element of the domain, or equivalently, if distinct elements of the domain map to distinct elements in the codomain. An injective function is also called an injection. Notationally:

or, equivalently (using logical transposition),

The function is surjective, or onto, if each element of the codomain is mapped to by at least one element of the domain. That is, the image and the codomain of the function are equal. A surjective function is a surjection. Notationally:

The function is bijective (one-to-one and onto, one-to-one correspondence, or invertible) if each element of the codomain is mapped to by exactly one element of the domain. That is, the function is both injective and surjective. A bijective function is also called a bijection. That is, combining the definitions of injective and surjective,

where  means "there exists exactly one ".
In any case (for any function), the following holds:

An injective function need not be surjective (not all elements of the codomain may be associated with arguments), and a surjective function need not be injective (some images may be associated with more than one argument). The four possible combinations of injective and surjective features are illustrated in the adjacent diagrams.

Injection

A function is injective (one-to-one) if each possible element of the codomain is mapped to by at most one argument. Equivalently, a function is injective if it maps distinct arguments to distinct images. An injective function is an injection. The formal definition is the following.

The function  is injective, if for all , 

The following are some facts related to injections:

Since every function is surjective when its codomain is restricted to its image, every injection induces a bijection onto its image. More precisely, every injection  can be factored as a bijection followed by an inclusion as follows. Let  be  with codomain restricted to its image, and let  be the inclusion map from  into . Then . A dual factorization is given for surjections below.
The composition of two injections is again an injection, but if  is injective, then it can only be concluded that  is injective (see figure).
Every embedding is injective.

Surjection

A function is surjective or onto if each element of the codomain is mapped to by at least one element of the domain. In other words, each element of the codomain has non-empty preimage. Equivalently, a function is surjective if its image is equal to its codomain. A surjective function is a surjection. The formal definition is the following.

The function  is surjective, if for all , there is  such that 

The following are some facts related to surjections:

(This statement is equivalent to the axiom of choice.)
By collapsing all arguments mapping to a given fixed image, every surjection induces a bijection from a quotient set of its domain to its codomain.
The composition of two surjections is again a surjection, but if  is surjective, then it can only be concluded that  is surjective (see figure).

Bijection

A function is bijective if it is both injective and surjective. A bijective function is also called a bijection or a one-to-one correspondence. A function is bijective if and only if every possible image is mapped to by exactly one argument. This equivalent condition is formally expressed as follow.

The function  is bijective, if for all , there is a unique  such that 

The following are some facts related to bijections:

This function maps each image to its unique preimage.
The bijections from a set to itself form a group under composition, called the symmetric group.

Cardinality
Suppose that one wants to define what it means for two sets to "have the same number of elements". One way to do this is to say that two sets "have the same number of elements", if and only if all the elements of one set can be paired with the elements of the other, in such a way that each element is paired with exactly one element. Accordingly, one can define two sets to "have the same number of elements"—if there is a bijection between them. In which case, the two sets are said to have the same cardinality.

Examples
It is important to specify the domain and codomain of each function, since by changing these, functions which appear to be the same may have different properties. 

Injective and surjective (bijective)
 The identity function idX for every non-empty set X, and thus specifically 
 , and thus also its inverse 
 The exponential function  (that is, the exponential function with its codomain restricted to its image), and thus also its inverse the natural logarithm 

Injective and non-surjective
 The exponential function 

Non-injective and surjective

Non-injective and non-surjective

Properties
If  is injective, then , and if  is surjective, then .
 For every function , one can define a surjection  and an injection . It follows that . This decomposition is unique up to isomorphism.

Category theory
In the category of sets, injections, surjections, and bijections correspond precisely to monomorphisms, epimorphisms, and isomorphisms, respectively.

History
The Oxford English Dictionary records the use of the word injection as a noun by S. Mac Lane in Bulletin of the American Mathematical Society (1950), and injective as an adjective by Eilenberg and Steenrod in Foundations of Algebraic Topology (1952).

However, it was not until the French Bourbaki group coined the injective-surjective-bijective terminology (both as nouns and adjectives) that they achieved widespread adoption.

See also
Horizontal line test
Injective module
Permutation

References

External links
Earliest Uses of Some of the Words of Mathematics: entry on Injection, Surjection and Bijection has the history of Injection and related terms.

Basic concepts in set theory
Mathematical relations
Functions and mappings